Keith Russell (born 31 January 1974) is an English footballer who played for Midland Football Combination Premier Division side Pelsall Villa, where he plays as a midfielder.

He played for Blackpool in the Football League in 1997.

References

External links

Keith Russell profile at altrinchamfc.co.uk

1974 births
Living people
People from Aldridge
English footballers
Association football midfielders
Tamworth F.C. players
Atherstone Town F.C. players
Hednesford Town F.C. players
Blackpool F.C. players
Altrincham F.C. players
Pelsall Villa F.C. players
English Football League players